The English city of Bristol has a number of churches.

Bristol has lost, rebuilt or demolished all of its strongly characteristic late medieval parish churches - the naves had no clerestories, any added aisles and chapels were separately gabled, all in simple Perpendicular style.  These include the church of St Thomas the Martyr, St Nicholas's church, Christ Church with St Ewen, St Werburgh's church, Temple church, St Peter's church, St Mary le Port church and the church of St Augustine the Less. The church of St Philip and St Jacob gives an idea of the Bristol style, but with much alteration.

There is also a list of former churches in Bristol.

The churches listed are Anglican except when otherwise noted.

See also
Buildings and architecture of Bristol

External links 

 ChurchCrawler list of Bristol Churches

References

Bristol
Bristol
Churches